Gyrophragmium is a genus of fungi in the family Agaricaceae. The genus was circumscribed by French botanist Camille Montagne in 1843.

The species known as G. dunalii was determined to properly belong into genus Agaricus, and since Agaricus dunalii was a preoccupied name it is now known as Agaricus aridicola.

See also
List of Agaricaceae genera
List of Agaricales genera

References

Agaricaceae
Agaricales genera
Taxa named by Camille Montagne
Taxa described in 1843